Exquisite Corpse is a studio album by American electronic music producer Daedelus. It was released on Mush Records and Ninja Tune in 2005.

Critical reception
At Metacritic, which assigns a weighted average score out of 100 to reviews from mainstream critics, the album received an average score of 66% based on 12 reviews, indicating "generally favorable reviews".

Track listing

References

Further reading

External links
 

2005 albums
Daedelus (musician) albums
Mush Records albums
Ninja Tune albums